Jordi Alba Ramos (born 21 March 1989) is a Spanish professional footballer who plays as a left-back for La Liga club Barcelona and captains the Spain national team. He is often regarded as one of the best laterais mundo e de sua generation.

Alba started his career at Barcelona, but was released after being deemed too small. After joining Cornellà, he moved to Valencia. In 2012 he returned to Barcelona, with whom he has won sixteen major honours, including five La Liga titles, five Copas del Rey and one UEFA Champions League.

After winning 23 caps and scoring one goal at youth level, Alba made his senior debut for Spain in 2011. He was an integral member of the team that won UEFA Euro 2012, and was also part of the squads at the FIFA World Cup in 2014, 2018, and 2022, and the European Championship in 2016 and 2020.

Club career

Early years
Alba was born in L'Hospitalet de Llobregat, Barcelona, Catalonia. He started his career in the youth ranks of Barcelona as a left winger, but was released by the club in 2005 for being too small. He then joined neighbouring club Cornellà and, after almost two years, departed in a €6,000 transfer to Valencia where he finished his football education.

After helping the reserves earn promotion from Tercera División in 2007–08, Alba played on loan at Segunda División club Gimnàstic Tarragona the following season, where he made 22 starts.

Valencia

After returning to Los Che, Alba made his La Liga debut on 13 September 2009, in a 4–2 win at Real Valladolid. He then started in two consecutive UEFA Europa League group stage matches, against Lille and Slavia Prague (both 1–1 draws, respectively away and home). Due to continuing injuries in Valencia's defence, he played much of 2009–10 as a left-back, posting overall good performances. In that position, on 11 April 2010, he scored his first goal for the club, in a 2–3 away loss to Mallorca.

In 2010–11, still with Unai Emery in charge, Alba was used almost always as a defender, battling for first-choice status with Jérémy Mathieu. He made 27 league appearances as the team again finished third, subsequently qualifying for the 2011–12 UEFA Champions League.

In the following campaign, Emery began using both players on Valencia's left side, a strategy he had tested the previous season. This proved an effective tactic as Alba and Mathieu frequently interchanged position and offered support for one another in both attacking and defensive areas; ultimately, the player credited the manager as a "key man" in his successful transition to a more defensive role.

Barcelona
On 28 June 2012, Alba signed a five-year contract with Barcelona for a transfer fee of €14 million. He made his official debut on 19 August, playing the full 90 minutes in a 5–1 home win against Real Sociedad.

Alba scored his first goal for the Blaugrana on 20 October 2012, the opener in a 5–4 win at Deportivo La Coruña, and scoring an own goal. In the following game, at home against Celtic in the Champions League group stage, he found the net in the 93rd minute of a 2–1 win.

On 12 March 2013, Alba scored his fifth goal of the campaign, scoring in the last minute to complete Barcelona's 4–0 home win over A.C. Milan in the Champions League round of 16 after a 0–2 first leg defeat at the San Siro, when his team became the first in the competition's history to overturn such a deficit. He ended his first season at Barcelona as league champion, as Tito Vilanova's side regained the title from Real Madrid.

On 2 June 2015, Alba agreed to a new five-year contract with a new buyout clause of €150 million. Four days later, he started in the Champions League final, helping the club to its fifth win in the competition by beating Juventus 3–1 at Berlin's Olympiastadion. He made 38 appearances in all competitions, with one goal, as Barça won a treble.

On 22 May 2016, Alba won the second Copa del Rey of his career, scoring in the 97th minute of the final against Sevilla after a through pass from Lionel Messi, in an eventual 2–0 extra-time win at the Vicente Calderón in Madrid.

On 11 March 2019, Alba agreed to a new five-year contract with a new buyout clause of €500 million.

Alba missed out on 50% of the games in the 2019–20 season, missing 12 out of 24 games, due to a hamstring injury and a muscle injury.

Alba had his best performance in the 2020–21 season where he scored 5 goals and 13 assists in all competitions as he won the Copa del Rey with his club.

On 9 August 2021, Jordi Alba was announced as the fourth captain of Barcelona after captain Lionel Messi left the club ahead of the 2021–22 season.

International career

Alba represented Spain at the 2008 UEFA European Under-19 Championship, as well as appearing in all four games as the country won the gold medal at the 2009 Mediterranenan Games. He was also part of the squad at the 2009 FIFA U-20 World Cup in Egypt.

Alba received his first call-up to the full national team on 30 September 2011, for the last two UEFA Euro 2012 qualifiers against the Czech Republic and Scotland. He made his debut against Scotland on 11 October, a 3–1 win in Alicante in which his cut back from the left wing provided the assist for the opening goal, scored by former Valencia teammate David Silva. His impressive debut confirmed his status as a strong candidate to be the long-term successor of Joan Capdevila as the regular left-back for La Roja, and he was also included in the under-23 squad for the 2012 Summer Olympics in London.

Alba was included in Vicente del Bosque's squad for the Euro 2012 finals in Poland and Ukraine, and played in every match, as Spain won the tournament. He supplied the cross for Xabi Alonso to open the scoring in the 2–0 quarter-final victory over France. In the final against Italy, after running onto a pass from Xavi during a counter-attack, he scored the second goal in a 4–0 win.

Alba was also selected for the 2013 FIFA Confederations Cup in Brazil. He played four complete matches during the tournament, scoring twice in the 3–0 group stage win over Nigeria.

Alba made Del Bosque's squad for the 2014 FIFA World Cup in Brazil, making three appearances as the defending champions were knocked out in the group stage. He was also named in Julen Lopetegui's squad for the 2018 World Cup in Russia and Luis Enrique's 24-man squad for the UEFA Euro 2020.

Following the absence of captain  Sergio Busquets due to coronavirus, Alba was given the captaincy until further notice. Alba was picked for the Spain squad at the 2022 World Cup in Qatar.

Style of play
Alba is a diminutive, technically gifted, mobile, and rapid attacking left-back, who can also be used as a left winger; he is known for his pace, link-up play, ball control, positioning, vision, movement, and his ability to time his attacking runs into space and get up the flank, as well as his ability to deliver crosses into the box, which allows him to provide assists for teammates. Moreover, he is also a tenacious tackler; however, his defending has been cited as a weakness by certain pundits, such as Enrique Ortego of Marca, although he was able to improve upon this aspect of his game as his career progressed. His speed and stamina allow him to be very involved in both his team's offensive and defensive plays, as he can get from one end of the pitch to the other very quickly, often pushing forward to get past players and score goals, or falling back when his team have lost possession.

In his prime, his connection and combination play with Lionel Messi rendered them one of the most effective attacking duos in world football and one of the most lethal in Barcelona's history. Regarded as a standard for left-backs in Europe by the media, Alba has earned plaudits from former left-backs Joan Capdevila and Roberto Carlos over his playing style and ability. He is also considered to be among the quickest players of his generation, and one of the fastest full-backs of all time.

Career statistics

Club

International

As of match played 6 December 2022. Spain score listed first, score column indicates score after each Alba goal.

Honours
Barcelona
La Liga: 2012–13, 2014–15, 2015–16, 2017–18, 2018–19
Copa del Rey: 2014–15, 2015–16, 2016–17, 2017–18, 2020–21; runner-up: 2013–14, 2018–19
Supercopa de España: 2013, 2016, 2018,  2022–23
UEFA Champions League: 2014–15
FIFA Club World Cup: 2015

Spain U20
Mediterranean Games: 2009

Spain
UEFA European Championship: 2012
FIFA Confederations Cup runner-up: 2013

Individual
UEFA European Championship Team of the Tournament: 2012
UEFA Champions League Team of the Season: 2014–15
La Liga Team of the Season: 2014–15
 ESM Team of the Year: 2017–18, 2018–19

References

External links

Profile at the FC Barcelona website

CiberChe biography and stats 

1989 births
Living people
Footballers from L'Hospitalet de Llobregat
Spanish footballers
Association football defenders
Association football wingers
UE Cornellà players
Valencia CF Mestalla footballers
Valencia CF players
Gimnàstic de Tarragona footballers
FC Barcelona players
Primera Catalana players
Tercera División players
Segunda División players
La Liga players
UEFA Champions League winning players
Spain youth international footballers
Spain under-21 international footballers
Spain under-23 international footballers
Olympic footballers of Spain
Spain international footballers
Catalonia international footballers
Competitors at the 2009 Mediterranean Games
UEFA Euro 2012 players
Footballers at the 2012 Summer Olympics
2013 FIFA Confederations Cup players
2014 FIFA World Cup players
UEFA Euro 2016 players
2018 FIFA World Cup players
UEFA Euro 2020 players
2022 FIFA World Cup players
Mediterranean Games medalists in football
Mediterranean Games gold medalists for Spain
UEFA European Championship-winning players